Newcastle upon Tyne Central is a constituency represented in the House of Commons of the UK Parliament since 2010 by Chi Onwurah of the Labour Party. As with all constituencies, the constituency elects one Member of Parliament (MP) by the first past the post system of election at least every five years.

History
Parliament created this seat under the Representation of the People Act 1918 for the general election later that year. It was one of four divisions of the parliamentary borough of Newcastle-upon-Tyne, which had previously been represented by one two-member seat. 

The constituency currently covers the central part of Newcastle upon Tyne, being one of three constituencies in the city. Between 1983 and 2010, the seat did not actually include the city's commercial centre, being instead part of the now-abolished Tyne Bridge constituency. 

From its creation, the constituency has been represented by only members of the Labour and Conservative parties. The seat has been represented by Labour since 1987.

At the 2017 and 2019 general elections, the constituency was the first to officially declare its result. It narrowly beat Houghton and Sunderland South, which had declared first in 2010 and 2015 (as did its predecessor Sunderland South in the four preceding general elections).

Boundaries

1918–1950 

 The County Borough of Newcastle upon Tyne wards of All Saints, St John's, St Nicholas, Stephenson, and Westgate.

1950–1955 

 The County Borough of Newcastle upon Tyne wards of Armstrong, Byker, St Anthony's, St Nicholas, and Stephenson; and
 The Rural District of Newcastle upon Tyne.

NB: the Rural District of Newcastle upon Tyne contained just a single building ('the Moot Hall and Precincts') in the centre of Newcastle.

Boundaries redrawn to take account of expansion of the County Borough and redistribution of wards. Expanded eastwards, gaining Byker and St Anthony's from Newcastle upon Tyne East, westwards, gaining Armstrong from Newcastle upon Tyne West. St John's and Westgate were transferred to Newcastle upon Tyne North. The constituency now comprised a narrow strip along the north bank of the River Tyne.

1955–1983 

 The County Borough of Newcastle upon Tyne wards of Armstrong, Benwell, Byker, St Anthony's, St Nicholas, and Stephenson; and
 The Rural District of Newcastle upon Tyne.

Benwell ward transferred from Newcastle upon Tyne West.

1983–1997

 The City of Newcastle upon Tyne wards of Blakelaw, Fenham, Jesmond, Kenton, Moorside, South Gosforth, and Wingrove.

Following the reorganisation of local authorities as a result of the Local Government Act 1972, the constituencies within the City of Newcastle upon Tyne were completely redrawn. The contents of the newly constituted seat comprised only a small area common to the previous version. The central and western areas of the old seat, including Benwell and the city centre, were incorporated into the new constituency of Tyne Bridge, which included parts of Gateshead Borough on the south side of the River Tyne. Byker and St Anthony's were returned to Newcastle upon Tyne East, along with the Battle Field area.

The new version of the constituency absorbed the whole of the existing Newcastle upon Tyne North seat, apart from Sandyford. It also included parts of the now abolished Newcastle upon Tyne West constituency (Fenham and Kenton) and a small area transferred from Wallsend (South Gosforth).

1997–2010 

 The City of Newcastle upon Tyne wards of Blakelaw, Fenham, Jesmond, Kenton, Moorside, Sandyford, South Gosforth, and Wingrove.

Sandyford ward transferred from Newcastle upon Tyne East, which was now abolished.

2010–present 

 The City of Newcastle upon Tyne wards of Benwell and Scotswood, Blakelaw, Elswick, Fenham, Kenton, Westgate, West Gosforth, and Wingrove.

Following their review of parliamentary representation in Tyne and Wear in 2007, which took effect at the 2010 general election, the Boundary Commission for England moved the Sandyford area back to the re-created constituency of Newcastle upon Tyne East, together with the suburb of Jesmond. Those areas north of the River Tyne in the now abolished Tyne Bridge constituency (Benwell, Scotswood, Elswick and the city centre) were transferred in.

Constituency profile
The constituency contains the city centre and surrounding suburbs. Previously based around heavy industry, such as shipbuilding, its adult population has mostly lower or middle incomes. The economy is now mainly focused on services and tourism.  In November 2012 total unemployment (based on the more up-to-date claimant statistics) placed the constituency in joint 17th place of 29 constituencies in the region, above, for example the City of Durham at the bottom of the list, with just 3.4% claimants whereas Newcastle had 6.0% claimants, identical to Sunderland Central.

Members of Parliament

Elections

Elections in the 2010s

Elections in the 2000s

Elections in the 1990s

Elections in the 1980s

Elections in the 1970s

Elections in the 1960s

Elections in the 1950s

Elections in the 1940s

Elections in the 1930s

Elections in the 1920s

Election in the 1910s

See also 
 List of parliamentary constituencies in Tyne and Wear
 History of parliamentary constituencies and boundaries in Tyne and Wear
 History of parliamentary constituencies and boundaries in Northumberland

Notes

References

Parliamentary constituencies in Tyne and Wear
Constituencies of the Parliament of the United Kingdom established in 1918
Politics of Newcastle upon Tyne